Robin Morrissey is a British screen and theatre actor. He is best known for his roles in the films Cloud Atlas (2012), and Mindhorn (2016).

Early life and education 
Morrissey attended Merchant Taylors' Boys' School, Crosby. In 2011 Morrissey graduated with an acting BA degree from the Royal Academy of Dramatic Art. His uncle is David Morrissey, an English actor and filmmaker.

Career 
In 2012, Morrissey made his professional debut playing Young Cavendish in the fantasy film Cloud Atlas directed by the Wachowskis and Tom Tykwer. In the same year, he played Bruno in the comedy horror film Love Bite.

In 2013, Morrissey starred as the young Paul O'Grady in the comedy-drama Little Crackers.

Morrissey made his stage debut at the Royal Exchange in Manchester in 2013. He played Tom in the First World War play The Accrington Pals by Peter Whelan. In 2014, Morrissey played Valentine in Twelfth Night in the opening production of the new Liverpool Everyman Theatre, Charles Bentham in Juno, the Paycock at the Bristol Old Vic, and Ben Ballard in Sex and the Three Day Week at the Liverpool Playhouse.

In 2016, Morrissey continued his film career playing PC Green, in the independent comedy film, Mindhorn.

Morrissey starred as Khlestakov in The Government Inspector for Ramps on the Moon in 2016.  The production was nominated for an Olivier Award for outstanding achievement by an affiliate theatre.

In 2017, he played Jamie in the BBC four-part series Apple Tree Yard alongside Emily Watson. He also played the title role of Gabriel in the UK Tour of Moira Buffini's WWII Drama, Gabriel alongside Paul McGann.

In 2018, Morrissey guest starred as Will Hurran, the nephew of Jimmy Clay in fourteen episodes of Doctors on the BBC.

In 2019, Morrissey played Leo in the UK tour of Edmond de Bergerac.

He has played Fred Thompson in The Tower since 2021.

Filmography

Film

Television

Theatre

References

Living people
21st-century British male actors
Year of birth missing (living people)